Spencer Howells Nelson (born July 11, 1980) is an American-born Azerbaijani naturalized former professional basketball player. At 6'8", he played at both small forward and power forward, although he was mainly considered a power forward.

High school
Spencer attended Pocatello High School and was named the Idaho A-1 Player of the Year as a senior in 1998. He averaged 22 points, 11 rebounds, five assists and two blocks per game as a senior.  Hit 43.3 percent of his three-pointers and sank 73.0 percent of his free throws as a senior.  As a junior, he averaged 14.1 points, 10.3 rebounds and shot 62.5 percent from the field.  Earned second-team all-state honors and first-team all-region honors as a junior.  Spencer had a notoriously loud and raucous group of fans in high school he named "The Sixth Man" which provided a home court advantage even on away games. Spencer's abilities were not limited to the basketball court as he was a four-year letterwinner in tennis, claiming the men's doubles state championship in 1998 and finishing third in mixed doubles in 1997.

College
After his freshman year, he went on a two-year mission to Oklahoma, serving the Church of Jesus Christ of Latter-day Saints. Upon his return, he became one of the Big West Conference's best players.

Nelson had a stellar career as an Aggie and was named to the Utah State University All-Century Team while still playing for Utah State.

Professional basketball
After graduating in 2005, he was not drafted in the 2005 NBA Draft. However, he was invited to try out for the Utah Jazz. He was an immediate fan favorite because of his success at Utah State. Despite playing well, Nelson was not chosen for the final roster, but was immediately offered a spot playing for GHP Bamberg in Germany. In 2006, instead of seeing if he'd make the final roster for the Jazz, Nelson chose to play for Benetton Treviso, a team that he made an outstanding performance against while playing with Bamberg in the Euroleague (he scored 23 points, pulled down 20 rebounds and delivered 7 assists) in a 92-85 home win.
Nelson's good performance helped the team qualify for the top 16 phase, the first ever German team to accomplish this achievement. 
After spending one season with Treviso, mainly coming from the bench, Nelson transferred to Climamio Bologna, also in Italy.  
On 26 January 2010 he stated that GHP Bamberg (Germany) was his favourite professional club he played for. He also told a local radio station to send greetings to the fans of his former club.

In July 2010 he signed a contract with CB Gran Canaria in the Spanish ACB, where he played with former Utah State teammate Jaycee Carroll during the season 2010/11.

In September 2013, he signed with the Italian club Montepaschi Siena for the 2013–14 season.

On November 13, 2014, he signed with Reyer Venezia Mestre for the 2014–15 season.

On July 14, 2015, Nelson announced his retirement from professional basketball.

Nelson returned to Utah State as an assistant coach on August 23, 2016.

Personal
After he retired from playing basketball, Nelson worked at Cicero Group in Salt Lake City, Utah, where he ran the company's private equity group. Nelson is married to Julie Clayton Nelson.

Awards

High school
 1997-98 Idaho A-1 Player of the Year

College
 2002-03 Big West Player of the Week (1/13/03)
 2002-03 Utah State Most Inspirational Player
 2002-03 Academic All-Big West
 2002-03 Big West Hustle Player of the Year
 2002-03 All-Big West Honorable Mention
 2003-04 Big West Player of the Week (1/12/04)
 2003-04 Utah State Most Inspirational Player
 2003-04 Multiple Sclerosis Society Utah State Chapter Collegiate Male Athlete of the Year
 2003-04 Academic All-Big West
 2003-04 Big West Hustle Player of the Year
 2003-04 Big West Second Team All-Conference
 2004-05 Big West Player of the Week (12/20/04)
 2004-05 Big West Player of the Week (1/31/05)
 2004-05 Big West Player of the Week (2/7/05)
 2004-05 Utah State Most Inspirational Player
 2004-05 Cecil Baker Most Valuable Player
 2004-05 Utah State Male Athlete of the Year
 2004-05 Utah State Big West Scholar-Athlete
 2004-05 Big West All-Tournament Team
 2004-05 Big West First Team All-Conference
 2004-05 Big West Hustle Player of the Year
 2004-05 United States Basketball Writer's Association All District 8 Team
 2004-05 CollegeInsider.com Mid Major Player of the Year

References

External links
 FIBA.com profile
 Eurocup player profile
 Utah State University All-Century Team

1980 births
Living people
21st-century Mormon missionaries
American emigrants to Azerbaijan
American expatriate basketball people in Germany
American expatriate basketball people in Greece
American expatriate basketball people in Italy
American expatriate basketball people in Spain
American Latter Day Saints
American Mormon missionaries in the United States
Aris B.C. players
Azerbaijani Latter Day Saints
Azerbaijani men's basketball players
Basketball players from Idaho
Brose Bamberg players
CB Gran Canaria players
Fortitudo Pallacanestro Bologna players
Greek Basket League players
Liga ACB players
Mens Sana Basket players
Naturalized citizens of Azerbaijan
Pallacanestro Treviso players
Peristeri B.C. players
Power forwards (basketball)
Small forwards
Sportspeople from Pocatello, Idaho
Utah State Aggies men's basketball players
American men's basketball players